Hisayoshi (written: , ,  or ) is a masculine Japanese given name. Notable people with the name include:

, Japanese baseball player
, Japanese judoka
, Japanese water polo player
, Japanese musician and composer
, Japanese swimmer
, Japanese voice actor
, Japanese botanist
, Japanese swimmer

Japanese masculine given names